An Election to the Glasgow Corporation was held on 3 November 1936, alongside municipal elections across Scotland.

Glasgow Corporation at the time was made up of 116 members, of whom 114 were elected. Following the election the Corporation was composed of 47 Progressives/Moderates (49 including the ex officio members, who sat as Progressives), 55 Socialists, and 12 ILP councilors.

Turnout was 248,053, or 51.99%.

Aggregate results

Ward Results

References

1936
1936 Scottish local elections
1930s in Glasgow